Matt Patrick or Matthew Patrick may refer to:

Matt Patrick (footballer) (1919–2005), Scottish footballer
Matt Patrick (producer) (born 1974), record producer, studio owner and musician
Matthew Patrick (cricketer) (born 2000), a Trinidadian cricketer
Matthew Patrick (politician) (born 1952), American politician from Massachusetts
MatPat (Matthew Patrick, born 1986), American YouTuber
Matthew Patrick, director of the 1989 film Hider in the House

See also 
Mathew St. Patrick (born 1968), American actor
Patrick Matthew (1790–1874), Scottish grain merchant